Sedgewick could refer to:

Robert Sedgewick (disambiguation), several people
 Sedgwick Avenue, Bronx, New York
Sedgewick, Alberta, place
General Sedgewick, a U.S. Army Ship in the American Civil War

See also
Sedgwick (disambiguation)